Football Club Tevragh-Zeïna is a Mauritanian football club based in the Tevragh-Zeina district of Nouakchott. The club was founded in 2005.

History 

In 2009, ASC Tevragh-Zeïna reached the final of the Coupe du Président de la République but lost to ASAC Concorde 5–4 on penalties after the game ended 0–0. In 2010, they won the competition, beating FC Feu Mini 3–0 in the final. By winning the Cup, they qualified for the 2011 CAF Confederation Cup.

On February 28, 2011, Tevragh-Zeïna became the first club from Mauritania since 1994 to advance in continental competition after beating AS Real Bamako of Mali 1–0 on aggregate in the preliminary round of the 2011 CAF Confederation Cup. However, they were eliminated in the following round after losing 3–1 on aggregate to JS Kabylie of Algeria.

Tevragh-Zeina won the 2014–15 Mauritanian Premier League title after defeating Sélibaby 4–0 in the last round and overtaking their rivals Cansado who came second with a difference of one point. As a result, they qualified for the 2016 CAF Champions League.

Achievements 
Mauritanian Premier League: 3
 2012, 2015, 2016.

Coupe du Président de la République: 5
 Winner : 2010, 2011, 2012, 2016, 2020.
 Finalist : 2009.

Coupe de la Ligue Nationale: 1
 Winner :  2017.

Mauritanian Super Cup: 3
 Winner :  2010, 2015, 2016.

Performance in CAF competitions 
CAF Confederation Cup: 1 appearance
2011 – first round
2020 – second round

Current squad

Managers
 Birama Gaye

References

External links 
Team profile  – maurifoot.net

Association football clubs established in 2005
Football clubs in Mauritania
Sport in Nouakchott
2005 establishments in Mauritania